Yessica Camilo González (born December 23, 1993) is a competitive archer from the Dominican Republic.

At the 2016 Summer Olympics in Rio de Janeiro, Camilo etched a historic mark for her country to compete in an Olympic tournament, shooting only in the women's individual recurve. Heading to the knockout stage as the lowest-ranked archer of the 64-female field with a score of 525 points, 4 perfect tens, and single bull's eye, Camilo lost her opening round match to the top-seeded South Korean and team recurve champion Choi Mi-sun, who comfortably dispatched her from the tournament with an easy 6–0 score.

References

External links
 
 http://results.toronto2015.org/IRS/en/archery/athlete-profile-n10182001-camilo-yessica.htm

1993 births
Living people
Dominican Republic female archers
Place of birth missing (living people)
Archers at the 2015 Pan American Games
Pan American Games competitors for the Dominican Republic
Olympic archers of the Dominican Republic
Archers at the 2016 Summer Olympics